Weija Dam is a dam on the Densu River which supports the main water treatment plant for Accra in the Greater Accra Region of Ghana. It is operated by the Ghana Water Company.This supplies about 80 percent of the potable water for the entire city of Accra and its surrounding environs.

References

Dams in Ghana
Embankment dams
Water supply and sanitation in Ghana
Greater Accra Region